Danny Mathijssen (born 17 March 1983) is a Dutch football manager and former professional player. He is the head coach of Derde Klasse club Victoria '03.

Career
Born in Bergen op Zoom, Mathijssen played professionally as a midfielder for Willem II, AZ, RKC Waalwijk and NAC Breda.

After retiring from playing due to injury in 2009, Mathijssen worked as a coach at RBC Roosendaal, before becoming manager of amateur team METO in 2011, a team he had previously played youth football for. He returned as head coach of RBC in 2016, leading the team from the Vierde Klasse to the Derde Klasse, before being dismissed after the 2017–18 season. In 2019, he joined Derde Klasse club Victoria '03. On 9 November 2021, he announced that he would leave the club at the end of the 2021–22 season.

References

1983 births
Living people
Dutch footballers
Dutch football managers
Willem II (football club) players
AZ Alkmaar players
RKC Waalwijk players
NAC Breda players
Sportspeople from Bergen op Zoom
Association football midfielders
Eredivisie players
RBC Roosendaal managers
Footballers from North Brabant